Flörsbach may refer to:

 Flörsbach (Lohr), a river in Hesse, Germany, tributary of the Lohr
 Flörsbach, a district of the municipality Flörsbachtal in Hesse, Germany